The Robbins Nest Covered Bridge is a covered bridge that crosses the Jail Branch of the Winooski River off US Route 302 in Barre, Vermont.

The bridge is of queen post design built by Robert R. Robbins.  Even though not historic, the bridge was built as a replica to one that stood just downstream and was swept away in the Vermont flood of 1927, and is of authentic design and construction.  Ownership of the property has transferred at least once, and in 1990 the owners installed steel beams to reinforce the deck.

References

Buildings and structures in Barre (town), Vermont
Bridges completed in 1962
Covered bridges in Vermont
Queen post truss bridges in the United States
Wooden bridges in Vermont
Covered bridges in Washington County, Vermont
Road bridges in Vermont